Brett Montgomery (born 1 June 1973) is a retired Australian rules football player and current assistant coach with the Port Adelaide Football Club.

Early life
Montgomery, known as "Monty", was originally recruited from South Croydon, and was recruited by Essendon Football Club (U19's & reserves) but was dropped from their list in 1991. Montgomery was also a talented cricketer, and had captained the under-19s Victorian team. In 1992 and 1993 he played club cricket in the Durham League and Middlesex League in England, before returning to Australia to refresh his Australian rules football career. He played with VFL side Springvale, playing in a premiership, then being picked up by Footscray, on their supplementary list. He won their reserves best and fairest, and finally at the end of 1996 was recruited to the Bulldogs' senior list (who had, by the time Montgomery first played in 1997, changed their name to the Western Bulldogs) for his chance to play at AFL level.
'Monty' is married to Terri Montgomery and has four children, Owen, Harper, Louie and Willow Montgomery.

AFL career

Western Bulldogs career (1997–1999)
He made his AFL debut in Round 2, 1997, beginning his career at the relatively late age of 23. He quickly adapted to AFL level, becoming a consistent and highly skilled half-back or running defender.

Port Adelaide career (2000–2005)
After 3 seasons at the Bulldogs, he was traded to the Port Adelaide Football Club, where he won the John Cahill Medal in his first season there in 2000. He won All-Australian selection in 2002, also playing in the International Rules series of that year.

Montgomery won a premiership medallion when his team won the 2004 Grand Final to win their first premiership in the AFL, capping off another solid season. In 2005, despite another strong year and finishing 6th in the John Cahill Medal, Montgomery was delisted by Port Adelaide coach Mark Williams, citing a focus on youth in the club's rebuilding phase. But he wasn't keen on retiring. He had only played 9 seasons at the elite level.

Western Bulldogs return (2006–2007)
The Western Bulldogs, the club he started his AFL career with, picked him up in the 2005 AFL Draft, and he became an important player in the 2006 season. In the Elimination Final win against Collingwood, he came back from a hard bump in the opening seconds from Brodie Holland and kicked an important career-best haul of four goals.

Retirement
On 25 May 2007, Montgomery announced his retirement after 204 games. He received a knock to the back area in round 1, 2007, against Geelong and had not played a match since. After being told that his recovery would take 6 to 18 months, he immediately announced his retirement, and has since joined ABC Local Radio as a special comments commentator. After the close of the 2007 season, Montgomery signed as an assistant coach at the Carlton Football Club, where he assumed the role as the defence coach until the end of the 2010 AFL season.

In September 2010, Montgomery made a third return to the Western Bulldogs, this time as an assistant coach, taking over the role vacated by Leon Cameron who defected to the Hawthorn Football Club.

In September 2018, Montgomery returned to the Port Adelaide Football Club as an assistant coach.

Playing statistics

|-
|- style="background-color: #EAEAEA"
! scope="row" style="text-align:center" | 1997
|style="text-align:center;"|
| 10 || 16 || 18 || 18 || 139 || 48 || 187 || 79 || 15 || 1.1 || 1.1 || 8.7 || 3.0 || 11.7 || 4.9 || 0.9
|-
! scope="row" style="text-align:center" | 1998
|style="text-align:center;"|
| 10 || 21 || 22 || 14 || 191 || 128 || 319 || 123 || 32 || 1.0 || 0.7 || 9.1 || 6.1 || 15.2 || 5.9 || 1.5
|- style="background-color: #EAEAEA"
! scope="row" style="text-align:center" | 1999
|style="text-align:center;"|
| 10 || 23 || 14 || 8 || 195 || 144 || 339 || 115 || 27 || 0.6 || 0.3 || 8.5 || 6.3 || 14.7 || 5.0 || 1.2
|-
! scope="row" style="text-align:center" | 2000
|style="text-align:center;"|
| 3 || 22 || 16 || 15 || 242 || 148 || 390 || 142 || 35 || 0.7 || 0.7 || 11.0 || 6.7 || 17.7 || 6.5 || 1.6
|- style="background-color: #EAEAEA"
! scope="row" style="text-align:center" | 2001
|style="text-align:center;"|
| 3 || 24 || 5 || 7 || 229 || 191 || 420 || 140 || 37 || 0.2 || 0.3 || 9.5 || 8.0 || 17.5 || 5.8 || 1.5
|-
! scope="row" style="text-align:center" | 2002
|style="text-align:center;"|
| 3 || 24 || 11 || 1 || 222 || 164 || 386 || 145 || 30 || 0.5 || 0.0 || 9.3 || 6.8 || 16.1 || 6.0 || 1.3
|- style="background-color: #EAEAEA"
! scope="row" style="text-align:center" | 2003
|style="text-align:center;"|
| 3 || 19 || 5 || 2 || 162 || 136 || 298 || 122 || 26 || 0.3 || 0.1 || 8.5 || 7.2 || 15.7 || 6.4 || 1.4
|-
! scope="row" style="text-align:center;" | 2004
|style="text-align:center;"|
| 3 || 14 || 5 || 3 || 123 || 110 || 233 || 85 || 20 || 0.4 || 0.2 || 8.8 || 7.9 || 16.6 || 6.1 || 1.4
|- style="background-color: #EAEAEA"
! scope="row" style="text-align:center" | 2005
|style="text-align:center;"|
| 3 || 23 || 9 || 2 || 208 || 149 || 357 || 159 || 35 || 0.4 || 0.1 || 9.0 || 6.5 || 15.5 || 6.9 || 1.5
|-
! scope="row" style="text-align:center" | 2006
|style="text-align:center;"|
| 43 || 17 || 14 || 7 || 110 || 90 || 200 || 77 || 23 || 0.8 || 0.4 || 6.5 || 5.3 || 11.8 || 4.5 || 1.4
|- style="background-color: #EAEAEA"
! scope="row" style="text-align:center" | 2007
|style="text-align:center;"|
| 43 || 1 || 0 || 0 || 0 || 2 || 2 || 1 || 0 || 0.0 || 0.0 || 0.0 || 2.0 || 2.0 || 1.0 || 0.0
|- class="sortbottom"
! colspan=3| Career
! 204
! 119
! 77
! 1821
! 1310
! 3131
! 1188
! 280
! 0.6
! 0.4
! 8.9
! 6.4
! 15.3
! 5.8
! 1.4
|}

References

External links
Brett Montgomery's profile at AustralianFootball.com

1973 births
All-Australians (AFL)
John Cahill Medal winners
Port Adelaide Football Club players
Port Adelaide Football Club Premiership players
Port Adelaide Football Club players (all competitions)
Western Bulldogs players
Casey Demons players
Living people
Australian rules footballers from Victoria (Australia)
Sturt Football Club players
Australia international rules football team players
One-time VFL/AFL Premiership players